The Acquario Romano (Roman Aquarium) is situated in Piazza Manfredo Fanti, Rome, Italy.

Description 
Designed by Ettore Bernich and built between 1885 and 1887, the building hosted an aquarium for few years. It was later used as a depot of the near Teatro dell'Opera, and sometimes as a venue for fairs and exhibitions.

A typical building of the age of king Umberto I, it has a circular plan and shows a pronaos with aediculas. Decorations with marine subject are inserted between the sculptures into the aediculas; between the caryatids are placed some medallions. The cylindrical body of the building is subdivided by lesenes and pilasters.

After a period of abandon, it was restored and used as a museum and seat for performances and concerts. It presently hosts the Casa dell'Architettura.

Cultural infrastructure completed in 1887
Buildings and structures in Rome
Neoclassical architecture in Italy